Tetavali is a small village in Dapoli Taluka, Ratnagiri district, Maharashtra state in Western India. The 2011 Census of India recorded a total of 2,008 residents in the village. Tetavali is 761.84 hectares in size.

See also
 Dapoli

References

Villages in Ratnagiri district